Ogilvie Raceway, is a high banked 3/8 mile Dirt clay oval race track located in Central Minnesota near Ogilvie, Minnesota. April - October weekly Wissota racing program consisting of Modifieds, Super Stocks, Midwest Modifieds, Modified 4sStreet Stocks and Hornets. Outdoor Go-Kart racing track was added in 2016. The track hosted the World of Outlaws Late Model Series in 2017 and 2018.

The track sits along the side of Highway 23.

History
Ogilvie Raceway opened their inaugural season on May 29, 2009 under owners Corey Owens and Lucas Ostermann. On July 13, 2009 Ogilvie Raceway added Mod 4's to their weekly lineup. The season ended with their banquet on December 12, 2009.

The Wagamon family purchased the track in 2015. As of 2015, the track was running under WISSOTA sanction with Modifieds, Midwest Modifieds, Super Stocks, Street Stocks, Mod Fours, and Hornets.

References

External links
Official website
Wissota Website

Motorsport venues in Minnesota
Buildings and structures in Kanabec County, Minnesota
Tourist attractions in Kanabec County, Minnesota
2009 establishments in Minnesota
Sports venues completed in 2009